The Master of the Rolls in Ireland was a senior judicial office in the Irish Chancery under English and British rule, and was equivalent to the Master of the Rolls in the English Chancery. Originally called the Keeper of the Rolls, he was responsible for the safekeeping of the Chancery records such as close rolls and patent rolls. The office was created by letters patent in 1333, the first holder of the office being Edmund de Grimsby. As the Irish bureaucracy expanded, the duties of the Master of the Rolls came to be performed by subordinates and the position became a sinecure which was awarded to political allies of the Dublin Castle administration. In the nineteenth century, it became a senior judicial appointment, ranking second within the Court of Chancery behind the Lord Chancellor of Ireland. The post was abolished by the Courts of Justice Act 1924, passed by the Irish Free State established in 1922.

History of the Office

Until the sixteenth century, the Master of the Rolls was always a clergyman. The office in its early centuries was closely associated with St. Patrick's Cathedral, Dublin: several medieval Masters of the Rolls served as either Dean or Prebendary of the Cathedral. The office was originally an administrative rather than a judicial office, and not all of the early Masters were qualified lawyers. As late as the mid-sixteenth century the office was held by John Parker, a layman who had made a fortune from selling hats; nor was his successor, Henry Draycott, as far as is known, a qualified lawyer; yet both performed the duties assigned to them more than competently. At that time, as the older title Keeper of the Rolls suggests, the Master's principal role was to have custody of the Chancery records. This office should not be confused with the separate office of Keeper of Writs and Rolls in the  Court of the Justiciar of Ireland.

The Master might act through a Deputy if he was incapacitated or absent on official business, although no actual office of Deputy Master is known to have existed. William Sutton acted as Deputy to his uncle Robert Sutton in the 1420s and Thomas Archbold deputised for Thomas Dowdall in 1479.

In the seventeenth and eighteenth centuries, the office of Master was notoriously a sinecure for absentee politicians, some of them British. Some of the appointments have been described as "farcical". Richard Rigby is said never to have set foot in Ireland during the 30 years he held the office, and William FitzGerald, 2nd Duke of Leinster, who succeeded him, had no qualifications whatever for judicial office.

Nineteenth-century reforms

In the nineteenth century, the office became a full-time judicial position: the Master acted as Deputy to the Lord Chancellor of Ireland, with full powers to hear any lawsuit brought in the Court of Chancery. A number of gifted judges, including Sir Michael Smith, Edward Sullivan and Andrew Marshall Porter greatly enhanced the reputation of the office. Michael O'Loghlen was notable not only as a fine judge but as the first Roman Catholic appointed to the Bench since 1688. The office was offered to Daniel O'Connell, who admitted that it was the only office he truly wanted but who nonetheless refused it. Charles Andrew O'Connor, the last holder of the office, was sufficiently highly regarded to be appointed a judge of the new Supreme Court of the Irish Free State.

Supersession
The 1922 Constitution of the Irish Free State prescribed a new court system for the new State but allowed the existing system, based on the Supreme Court of Judicature Act (Ireland) 1877, to persist as a transitional measure. In 1923, Charles Andrew O'Connor as Master of the Rolls participated in the Judiciary Committee established by the Free State Executive Council which planned the Courts of Justice Act 1924. In this capacity he caused controversy by refusing to admit an affidavit written in Irish because he did not know the language. When the 1924 Act was passed, O'Connor became a judge of the new Supreme Court. The officers of the Chamber of the Master of the Rolls were transferred in 1926 to the Examiner's Office.

List of Masters of the Rolls in Ireland

1333 Edmund de Grimsby
1334 William de Bardelby
1337 Robert de Hemmingburgh
1346 William de Whithurst
1350 Robert de Leycestre
1356 Thomas de Cottingham
1372 Thomas de Thelwall
1377 Robert Sutton
1386 Thomas de Everdon, Dean of St. Patrick's Cathedral
1395 Robert de Faryngton, or de Farrington
1395 Robert Sutton, second term
1395 John de Kirkby
1404 Robert Sutton, third term
1427 Richard Ashwell 
1430 William Sutton
1436 Robert Dyke
1450 John Chevir
1461 Patrick Cogley
1461 Peter Trevers
1471 Thomas Dowdall
1492 Thomas Butler
1496 John Payne, Bishop of Meath
1513 Thomas Rochfort, Dean of St. Patrick's Cathedral
1521 Walter Wellesley, Bishop of Kildare
1522 Thomas Darcy, Dean of St. Patrick's Cathedral
1523 John Rycardes, Dean of St. Patrick's Cathedral
1528 Thomas Darcy, second term 
1530 Anthony Skeffington
1533 John Alan
1539 Robert Cowley
1542 Thomas Cusack

1543  Nicholas  Wycombe 
1550 Patrick Barnewall
1552 John Parker
1566 Henry Draycott
1572 Nicholas White, first term 
1578 Edward Fitz-Symon
1578 Nicholas White, second term 
1593 Anthony St Leger
1609 Francis Aungier, 1st Baron Aungier of Longford
1633 Christopher Wandesford
1641 Sir John Temple
1677 Sir William Temple, 1st Baronet
1689 Sir William Talbot, 3rd Baronet
1690 Sir William Temple, second term 
1696 William Berkeley, 4th Baron Berkeley of Stratton
1731 Thomas Carter
1754 Henry Singleton
1759 Richard Rigby
1788 William Robert Fitzgerald, 2nd Duke of Leinster
1789 John Crosbie, 2nd Earl of Glandore and John Proby, 1st Earl of Carysfort jointly
1801 Sir Michael Smith, 1st Baronet
1806 John Philpot Curran
1814 Sir William MacMahon, 1st Baronet
1837 Sir Michael O'Loghlen, 1st Baronet
1842 Francis Blackburne
1846 Thomas Berry Cusack Smith
1866 John Edward Walsh
1870 Sir Edward Sullivan, 1st Baronet
1883 Sir Andrew Porter, 1st Baronet
1906 Richard Edmund Meredith
1912 Charles Andrew O'Connor (last holder)

Office abolished in 1924.

See also
Master of the Rolls

References

Sources
The Oxford Companion to Law, ed David M Walker, 1980
The Judges in Ireland 1221–1921, F. Elrington Ball, 1926
Chronicle of the Law Officers of Ireland Constantine Joseph Smyth 1839

Political office-holders in pre-partition Ireland
 Master of the Rolls in Ireland